John Bryce Thomson (1840 – 16 August 1911) was Mayor of Dunedin in 1882. 

Thomson was born in Stirlingshire in 1840. After a carpentry apprenticeship in Glasgow, he emigrated to Dunedin in 1864. Thomson founded the successful construction company McGill & Thomson with James McGill. Thomson was first elected to the City Council in 1876. Also chairman of the Otago Harbour Board, a member of the Hospital Board, and a trustee of the Benevolent Society. When his partnership with McGill was dissolved in 1893, Thomson conducted the business with his elder son. Thomson died at Dunedin on 16 August, 1911.

References 

Mayors of Dunedin
1840 births
1911 deaths